Brian Andre Victoria (born 1939) is an American educator, Doctor of Philosophy, writer and Buddhist priest in the Sōtō Zen sect. He has published numerous works on the relationship of religion to violence, with a focus on the relationship between Buddhism and Japanese militarism around World War II.

Education
Victoria is a native of Omaha, Nebraska. He graduated in 1961 from Nebraska Wesleyan University in Lincoln, Nebraska. He trained at the Sōtō Zen monastery of Eihei-ji and holds a M.A. in Buddhist Studies from the Sōtō Zen–affiliated Komazawa University in Tokyo. He received his Ph.D. from the Department of Religious Studies at Temple University.

Vietnam era

Victoria was a war protester during the Vietnam War.

Affiliation
Victoria has taught Japanese language and culture at the University of Nebraska at Omaha, Creighton University, and Bucknell University in the United States and lectured in the Department of Asian Languages and Literatures at the University of Auckland. He was a Senior Lecturer in the Centre in Asian Studies at the University of Adelaide in South Australia. He has also been Yehan Numata Distinguished Visiting Professor, Buddhist Studies at the University of Hawaii-Manoa in Honolulu. 
From 2005 to 2013, he was a professor of Japanese Studies and director of the Antioch Education Abroad “Japan and Its Buddhist Traditions Program” at Antioch University in Yellow Springs, OH. Since 2013, he a Fellow at Oxford Centre for Buddhist Studies at the University of Oxford and a Visiting Research Fellow at the International Research Center for Japanese Studies in Kyoto.

Zen at War

First published in 1997, Zen at War is based on the work of Japanese scholars and Victoria's own studies of original Japanese documents. It describes the influence of state policy on Japanese Buddhism before and during WWII and conversely the influence of Zen philosophy on the Japanese military. The book has been hailed as a major contribution to a previously unexamined aspect of Japanese religious history, and criticized for imposing anachronistic values when evaluating the words and deeds of the time.

Criticisms
There are a number of criticisms directed at Victoria's methodology in critiquing a number of individuals.  Most prominently in Zen at War, but also in subsequent articles.  The criticisms have focused on Victoria's portrayals of D. T. Suzuki, Kōdō Sawaki, and Tsunesaburō Makiguchi.

Henry Schliff of the University of Colorado, in reviewing the essay compilation Buddhist Warfare, cites the methodology of Victoria's essay, “A Buddhological Critique of 'Soldier-Zen' in Wartime Japan", as the one major flaw in the book:

Works

Books

(With Yuho Yokoi) 

 Zen Terror in Prewar Japan: Portrait of an Assassin. Rowman & Littlefield Publishers, Inc. 2020. ISBN 978-1538131664.

Articles
"When God(s) and Buddhas Go to War." In War and State Terrorism: The United States, Japan, and the Asia-Pacific in the Long Twentieth Century. Edited by Mark Selden and Alvin Y. So.  2003. Rowman & Littlefield Publishers. pp. 91–118. 
(With Muneo Narusawa)  "'War is a Crime': Takenaka Shōgen and Buddhist Resistance in the Asia-Pacific War and Today". The Asia-Pacific Journal, Vol. 12, Issue 37, No. 4, September 15, 2014.
"Sōka Gakkai Founder, Makiguchi Tsunesaburō, A Man of Peace?". The Asia-Pacific Journal, Vol. 12, Issue 37, No. 3, September 15, 2014.
"Zen Masters on the Battlefield (Part II)" . The Asia-Pacific Journal, Vol. 11, Issue 27, No. 4, July 7, 2014.
"Zen Masters on the Battlefield (Part I)" . The Asia-Pacific Journal, Vol. 11, Issue 24, No. 3, June 16, 2014.
"A Zen Nazi in Wartime Japan: Count Dürckheim and his Sources—D.T. Suzuki, Yasutani Haku’un and Eugen Herrigel" . The Asia-Pacific Journal, Vol. 12, Issue 3, No. 2, January 20, 2014.
"D.T. Suzuki, Zen and the Nazis". The Asia-Pacific Journal, Vol. 11, Issue 43, No. 4, October 28, 2013.
"Zen as a Cult of Death in the Wartime Writings of D.T. Suzuki". The Asia-Pacific Journal, Vol. 11, Issue 30, No. 4, August 5, 2013.
"Buddhism and Disasters: From World War II to Fukushima" . The Asia-Pacific Journal", n.d.
"Karma, War and Inequality in Twentieth Century Japan". The Asia-Pacific Journal'', n.d.

Notes

External links
 Brian Victoria – List of articles at The Asia-Pacific Journal
  - List of articles at the zensite

Zen Buddhism writers
American Buddhists
American Zen Buddhists
Soto Zen Buddhists
Zen Buddhist priests
Temple University alumni
Komazawa University alumni
Nebraska Wesleyan University alumni
Living people
1939 births
Writers from Omaha, Nebraska
Buddhism in Nebraska